Arabellapark is a Munich U-Bahn station in Bogenhausen borough. It is the eastern terminus of the U4. Arabellapark station is located in the Arabellapark district of Bogenhausen, a large housing and commercial district developed during the 1970s. 
Arabellapark station serves as an important bus interchange station for buses servicing Bogenhausen. It is the terminus of bus lines 183, 184, 185 and 187.

Extension plans
There are plans to extend the U4 from Arabellapark towards Englschalking S-Bahn station in the eastern quarter of Bogenhausen. However, these plans have been put on hold due to budget restraints. The city planning authority is considering a tramway or Stadtbahn extension from Effnerplatz instead.

References

External links

Munich U-Bahn stations
Railway stations in Germany opened in 1988
1988 establishments in West Germany